Motoring is a 1927 British silent comedy film directed by George Dewhurst and starring Harry Tate, Henry Latimer and Roy Travers. It was based on one of Tate's own music hall sketches. The screenplay concerns a passing motorist who helps a woman to elope with her lover.

Cast
 Harry Tate - Harry
 Henry Latimer - Basil Love
 Roy Travers - Sir Stone Flint
 Ronald Tate - The Boy

References

Bibliography
 Low, Rachael. History of the British Film, 1918-1929. George Allen & Unwin, 1971.

External links

1927 films
British silent feature films
1927 comedy films
Films directed by George Dewhurst
British comedy films
Films set in England
British black-and-white films
1920s English-language films
1920s British films
Silent comedy films